Ashley Boettcher (born September 3, 2000) is an American actress. Boettcher has acted since the age of four and is best known for her role as Melody Fuller in the Amazon Studios Original Series Gortimer Gibbon's Life on Normal Street.

Life and career
Boettcher was born on September 3, 2000, in Texas, United States. She began acting at the age of four. She describes her start in  acting as "a long story, but the shorter answer is that all the right doors opened and I was born to do it."

She has been in multiple television shows and movies, and is mainly recognized for her roles in Aliens in the Attic as Hannah Pearson, and as Mel Fuller in Gortimer Gibbon's Life on Normal Street.

Filmography

Awards and nominations

References

External links

2000 births
Living people
Actresses from Texas
American child actresses
American film actresses
American television actresses
American video game actresses
American voice actresses
21st-century American actresses